Lauper is a surname. Notable people with the name include:

Cyndi Lauper (born 1953), American signer
Erwin Lauper (born 1946), Swiss wheelchair curler
Nils Lauper (born 1982), Swiss freestyle skier
Rolf Lauper (1960–2006), Swiss footballer
Sandro Lauper (born 1996), Swiss footballer

See also
Claudia Lauper Bushman (born 1934), American historian